The Tebet Eco Park or Taman Kota Tebet is a park located at Tebet in Jakarta, Indonesia. The park was previously known as Tebet Honda Park and  has a land area of 7 hectares. It is a popular place for exercise, socialization, and recreation for neighboring community.

Facilities
This park was revitalized in 2022, for multi-functional purposes. It has three main concepts in its development, namely prioritizing ecological functions, especially flood control, social space functions, and also the function of educational and recreational spaces for residents. This park has forest buffer, link bridge, community lawn, wetland boardwalk, children’s playground, plaza, community garden, and thematic garden. The park has two part, north and south, connected by a pedestrian bridge.
 
There is a Wetland Boardwalk to help contain water flow and increase water retention. Meanwhile, in the Community Garden, there is the main entrance to the South Area with a pavilion equipped with facilities for social activities for the community around Tebet. Swamp Playground or children's play area with a variety of games and viewing decks that take advantage of different contours. The northern part of the park, there are TEP Plaza, thematic gardens, and community lawns. TEP plaza serves as a drop-off area or a visitor's recipient, equipped with a pavilion building, amphitheater, parking facilities and MSMEs. Furthermore, opposite TEP Plaza there is an area with an existing density of Leda trees which is used as a Thematic Garden. Meanwhile, Community Lawn is presented as an area for public activities to do whitout family or friends, in the field, with an interactive open lawn.

References

South Jakarta
Parks and lakes in Jakarta